U.S. Route 69 (US 69) is a north–south United States highway that runs from Port Arthur, Texas to Albert Lea, Minnesota. In Texas, US 69 runs from Port Arthur near the Gulf of Mexico to the Texas–Oklahoma state line just north of Denison.

Route description

US 69 begins at its southern terminus with SH 87 in Port Arthur.  This intersection is also the southern terminus for US 96 and US 287, which are concurrent with US 69.  US 69, US 96, and US 287 continue in a northwest, then west, route until its intersection with Interstate 10 in southern Beaumont. At this intersection, US 69, US 96, and US 287 merge with I-10. I-10/US 69/US 96/US 287 continue in a northerly direction through Beaumont for several miles. Just after the intersection with US 90, I-10 splits from the multiplex and resumes its easterly course, leaving US 69, US 96, and US 287 heading northwest through Beaumont. US 69 north of I-10 is also known officially known as Eastex Freeway, and is an official evacuation route, just as Interstate 69/US 59 heading north from Houston is known as Eastex Freeway as well.

In Lumberton, US 96 splits from US 69 and US 287 and heads northeast towards Jasper, while US 69 and US 287 continue on a northwest path towards Woodville.

In Woodville, US 69 splits from US 287 a few blocks north of US 190. US 287 continues northwest towards Corrigan while US 69 proceed north towards Lufkin.  In this area, between US 190 in Woodville and FM 256 in Colmesneil, US 69 is a part of the Texas Forest Trail.  Before reaching Lufkin, US 69 forms another segment of the Texas Forest Trail between SH 63 in Zavalla and FM 1818 northwest of Zavalla.

In Lufkin, US 69 is concurrent with US 59 and State Loop 287 while the route through the city is named Business US 69.  US 69, State Loop 287, and US 59 continue around the east side of Lufkin until US 59 separates at the intersection with US 59 Business northeast of Lufkin. US 69 and State Loop 287 continue until the intersection of SH 103 and Business US 69 on the northwest section of Lufkin.  At that point, US 69 is concurrent for a short distance with SH 103 and State Loop 287.  At the intersection of US 69, State Loop 287 and SH 103, US 69 departs Lufkin and heads northwest while SH 103 and State Loop 287 head south.

US 69 continues on a north to northwest path through the towns of Alto, Rusk, Jacksonville and Bullard.  Just south of Bullard, US 69 has a short concurrency with FM 2493.  US 69 continues northward into Tyler.

In Tyler, US 69 continues northward through the city until the intersection of SH 110 and SH 155, where US 69 heads west and merges with SH 110 and SH 155 through Tyler. Around seven blocks from the intersection of US 69, SH 110, and SH 155, SH 155 separates from the concurrency and travels in a southwesterly direction, leaving US 69 and SH 110 traveling in a northwesterly direction. This continues until SH 110 separates from US 69 on the northwest side of Tyler. At this intersection, SH 110 heads west while US 69 continues north.

US 69 crosses Interstate 20 at Lindale where it is signed as "Main Street".  At FM 16 in Lindale, US 69 begins its third and last segment as part of the Texas Forest Trail.  US 69 continues north to northwest to Mineola, crossing US 80 there.  Before leaving town, at its intersection with SH 37, the Texas Forest Trail turns off of US 69 to share a segment with SH 37.  US 69 takes a more northwest turn on its way through several small towns, including Emory, on its way to Greenville.  There, as it begins to enter the city, a Business route of US 69 turns off to the right to serve the downtown Greenville area, and then on to a junction with Interstate 30. At the intersection with I-30, US 69 becomes concurrent with US 380 at its terminus. The concurrency continues around the southern and western sides of Greenville until an intersection with Spur 302. At that intersection, US 380 heads west while US 69 continues north, until it reaches the northern end of its Business route, which has passed through the downtown Greenville area, then US 69 turns northwest, from Greenville to Leonard, where it encounters a brief concurrency with SH 78.

In Whitewright, SH 11 intersects and becomes concurrent with US 69 southeast of town. This continues until the intersection with SH 160, at which time SH 11 continues on a northwestward route and US 69 continues north through Whitewright.

US 69 continues north, then northwest until Denison, where it turns right to go north, at an intersection with Spur 503. US 69 goes north through downtown Denison, then at the north side of town, US 69 intersects and merges with US 75, at which time US 69 becomes concurrent with US 75. Both head northeast across the Oklahoma/Texas border at the Red River.

Junction list

Notes

References

External links

 Texas
Transportation in Jefferson County, Texas
Transportation in Hardin County, Texas
Transportation in Tyler County, Texas
Transportation in Angelina County, Texas
Transportation in Cherokee County, Texas
Transportation in Smith County, Texas
Transportation in Wood County, Texas
Transportation in Rains County, Texas
Transportation in Hunt County, Texas
Transportation in Fannin County, Texas
Transportation in Grayson County, Texas
69